The term Bishopric of Syrmia (also Srem, or Srijem) may refer to:

 Serbian Orthodox Bishopric of Syrmia, an Eastern Orthodox diocese of the Serbian Orthodox Church
 Roman Catholic Bishopric of Syrmia, one of dioceses of Roman Catholic Church, Serbia

See also
 Syrmia
 Diocese of Syrmia (disambiguation)
 Eastern Orthodoxy in Serbia
 Catholic Church in Serbia